"Higher and Higher" is the opening track of the Moody Blues 1969 album To Our Children's Children's Children, a concept album about space travel.

The verses of the song are spoken by Mike Pinder, rather than sung.  Sound effects of a rocket launching begin the song and last for the first minute.

"Higher and Higher" was also the Moody Blues' first full length song that was written by the band's drummer Graeme Edge.  Edge was usually the writer of short spoken-word interludes that appeared at the beginning and end of previous albums.  In the recordings, they were usually recited by Mike Pinder.

The album was one of those listened to, on cassette tape, by the crew of Apollo 15 in 1971.

Personnel
 Mike Pinder – Mellotron, Hammond Organ, EMS VCS 3, vocals
 Justin Hayward – acoustic and electric guitars, backing vocals
 John Lodge – bass guitar, backing vocals
 Ray Thomas – tambourine, backing vocals
 Graeme Edge – drums, percussion

References

External links
 

1969 songs
The Moody Blues songs
Songs written by Graeme Edge